Epermenia profugella, also known as the little lance-wing is a moth of the family Epermeniidae found in northern, central and eastern Europe. The moth was first described by Henry Tibbats Stainton in 1856, from a specimen found in Kemsing, Kent, England.

Description
The wingspan is 8–10 mm. The forewings are dull greyish bronze, tinged with fuscous and the hindwings are dark grey.

Ova, are probably laid on the seeds of ground-elder (Aegopodium podagraria), angelica (Angelica sylvestris), wild carrot (Daucus carota) and burnet-saxifrage (Pimpinella saxifraga). The larvae feed within the seeds, spinning two or three together during September and October. Feeding is inconspicuous, but larvae can sometimes be seen on the outside of seeds. The species overwinters in the pupal stage within a flimsy cocoon on the ground.

References

Epermeniidae
Moths described in 1856
Moths of Europe
Taxa named by Henry Tibbats Stainton